The Vettweiss-Froitzheim Dice Tower is a Roman artifact, a dice tower formerly used in the playing of dice games. It was intended to produce a trustworthy throw of one or more dice. It was discovered in 1985 in Germany. It is preserved in the Rheinisches Landesmuseum of Bonn.

The tower dates to the fourth century AD and was apparently presented as a gift. It bears two Latin texts. The longer text commemorates a military defeat of the Picts. The shorter text wishes good luck to the unnamed recipients of the item.

Discovery

The dice tower was discovered in 1985 near the modern villages of Vettweiss and Froitzheim. During the Roman era this location was in the province of Germania Inferior on the Imperial frontier with Germania. This was the site of a villa in the German state of North Rhine-Westphalia. The major military centre of Cologne was located nearby.

Description
It is an upright, hollow cuboid of copper-alloy plate designed to sit level on a flat surface. The top of the dice tower is open, allowing for the introduction of dice, and it contains three levels of projecting baffles which would produce random motion in the dice as they fell through the tower.
The dice would then emerge at the base of the tower via a miniature flight of steps. The dice, while emerging, would ring three bells which formerly hung above the exit. One of these bells survives intact.

The tower is decorated on all faces with pierced patterns and two short Latin texts are displayed prominently.

The front face of the tower bears the words:

PICTOS VICTOS
HOSTIS DELETA
LVDITE SECVRI

Which can be translated as:

With the Picts defeated,
The enemy has been destroyed,
So play in safety.

Around the top of the three remaining faces is the phrase,

UTERE FELIX VIVAS

Which can be translated as:

Use [me] and live luckily/happily.

References 

Celtic archaeological artifacts
Picts
Dice
1985 in Germany
4th-century artefacts